Karlslunds IF FK is a Swedish football club located in the Karlslund neighbourhood in western Örebro.

Background
Karlslunds IF's football team has participated mainly in the lower divisions of the Swedish football league system but has enjoyed periods of success most notably an appearance in Division 1 Norra in 2009 and a few seasons in Division 2 in the 1980s.  The club currently plays in Division 1 Norra which is the third tier of Swedish football. They play their home matches at the Karlslund Arena in Örebro.

The club is affiliated to the Örebro Läns Fotbollförbund.

Season to season

Attendances

In recent seasons Karlslunds IF FK have had the following average attendances:

Current squad

Other sports 
Since their foundation on 27 April 1920 Karlslunds IF has been active in a number of sports including:

 Bandy – Karlslunds IF BF
 Baseball/Softball,  KIF Eagles Baseball & Softball
 Bowling – KIF Bowling and Strike & CO Örebro
 Ladies Football –  KIF Örebro DFF
 Men's Football – Karlslunds IF HFK
 Gymnastics – Örebro Gymnastikförening – KIF
 Swimming –  Örebro Simallians
 Skiing – Karlslunds IF skidor

Karlslunds IF runs the biggest programme for athletics in Örebro, Sweden, with some 4000 members and more than 200 coaches coaching eight different sports. Currently women's soccer (known as KIF Örebro DFF) and men's Nordic skiing are the most successful.

Footnotes

 
Sport in Örebro
Association football clubs established in 1920
1920 establishments in Sweden